The Taipei Economic and Cultural Office in Hong Kong (TECO) is the representative office of the Republic of China (Taiwan) in Hong Kong. Its counterpart body in Taiwan is the Hong Kong Economic, Trade and Cultural Office in Taiwan.

The de facto diplomatic mission is placed administratively under the Mainland Affairs Council, Executive Yuan, but it also houses departments that serve as outposts of the National Immigration Agency and the Bureau of Consular Affairs (Ministry of Foreign Affairs).

Its cultural arm, known as Kwang Hwa Information and Culture Centre, is an overseas agency of the Ministry of Culture.

The General Manager of TECO is also the Director of the Bureau of Hong Kong Affairs in the Mainland Affairs Council of the Executive Yuan. The founding director of the office was Susie Chiang Su-hui.

Previously located at Tower 1, Lippo Centre in Admiralty, the office has been relocated to Central Plaza in Wan Chai since December 2021.

History 

The Taipei Economic and Cultural Office in Hong Kong, initially known as Chung Hwa Travel Service, was first established in Hong Kong in 1966 during British rule. This operated under quasi-diplomatic arrangements unilaterally extended by the British authorities.

Previously, while the National Government of the Republic of China in Nanjing had negotiated with the British regarding the appointment of a Consul-General in 1945, it decided against such an appointment, with its representative in the colony, T W Kwok (Kuo Teh-hua) instead being styled Special Commissioner for Hong Kong. This was in addition to his role as Special Commissioner for Guangdong and Guangxi.

Disagreements also arose with the British authorities, with the Governor, Alexander Grantham, opposing an office building for the "Commissioner for Foreign Affairs of the Provinces of Kwantung and Kuangsi" being erected on the site of the Walled City in Kowloon.

In 1950, following British recognition of the People's Republic of China, the office of the Special Commissioner was closed and Kwok withdrawn.

Following the transfer of sovereignty to the People's Republic of China in 1997, the Service continued to operate, despite not having been officially registered with the Hong Kong SAR Government. However, in 2000, Beijing set out the conditions under which the Chung Hwa Travel Service could operate in Hong Kong, although the Mainland Affairs Council refused to detail them.

In 2004, the newly-appointed managing director of the Service faced a five-month delay before received approval to enter Hong Kong and assume his post. Similarly, other Taiwan government officials faced difficulties in obtaining visas to visit Hong Kong.

In 2009, the Service opened a visa office at Hong Kong International Airport, thereby allowing mainland visitors to Taiwan to collect their visas at the airport instead of having to travel to the office in Admiralty.

On 20 July 2011, in a ceremony presided over by Mainland Affairs Council Chairwoman Lai Shin-yuan, it was renamed the Taipei Economic and Cultural Office. This brought it into line with most other representative offices around the world, which already had "Taipei" in their titles. The renaming was considered a milestone in the improved cross-strait relations between Taipei and Beijing.

On 20 June 2021, Taiwan recalled its staff working at the office after the Government of Hong Kong demanded them to sign a document supporting the 1992 Consensus. Only local staff remained to maintain operations.

On 20 December 2021, the entire office completed relocation from Lippo Centre in Admiralty to the Central Plaza in Wan Chai.

Transportation
The office is accessible within walking distance north from Wan Chai Station of the Hong Kong MTR.

See also 

 Hong Kong–Taiwan Economic and Cultural Co-operation and Promotion Council
 Taipei Economic and Cultural Office in Macau
 Hong Kong Economic, Trade and Cultural Office
 List of diplomatic missions of Taiwan
 Consular missions in Hong Kong
 Cross-Strait relations
 Foreign relations of Taiwan

References

External links 

  in Chinese
 Kwang Hwa Information and Culture Centre

2011 establishments in Hong Kong
Hong Kong
Taiwan
Politics of Hong Kong
Hong Kong–Taiwan relations